was a Japanese avant-garde composer and pianist. One of the leading composers in Japan during the postwar era, Ichiyanagi worked in a range of genres, composing Western-style operas and orchestral and chamber works, as well as compositions using traditional Japanese instruments. Ichiyanagi is known for incorporating avant-garde techniques into his works, such as chance music, extended technique, and nontraditional scoring. Ichiyanagi was married to artist Yoko Ono from 1956 to 1962.

Early life and education
Ichiyanagi was born in Kobe on 4 February 1933. He studied composition with Tomojirō Ikenouchi, and John Cage. From 1954 to 1960, he resided in New York City, where he studied at the Juilliard School and the New School for Social Research.

Ichiyanagi was married to Yoko Ono from 1956 to 1962. Ichiyanagi's decision to return to Japan, while Ono remained in New York, rendered the marriage untenable.

Career
Returning to Japan in 1960, Ichiyanagi collaborated with the anti-art collective Neo-Dada Organizers.

Many of Ichiyanagi's early scores use graphic notation: Sapporo (1963) is one of the better known examples. Another notable early work is the 1960 composition Kaiki, which combined Japanese instruments, shō and koto, and western instruments, harmonica and saxophone. Another work, Distance (1961), required the performers to play from a distance of three meters from their instruments. Anima 7 (1964) stated that chosen action should be performed "as slowly as possible". In 1963, Ichiyanagi co-founded an avant-garde music collective called New Direction along with fellow composers Takehisa Kosugi, Yuji Takahashi, and Kenji Kobayashi, and others. The group disbanded in the late 1960s when most of its members relocated to New York, while Ichiyanagi remained in Japan.

Ichiyanagi's later works shifted away from experimental means toward more conventional forms, including symphonies, operas and concertos. He was the recipient of the 33rd Suntory Music Award (2001) and the Foundation for Contemporary Arts John Cage Award (2018). He has been honored with Japan's Order of Culture.

Personal life and death
Ichiyanagi's father was Shinji Ichiyanagi, a cellist, and his mother was Mitsuko Ichiyanagi, who gave piano lessons in their home and was her son's first piano teacher. After his marriage to Yoko Ono ended in 1962, Ichiyanagi was married a second time in 1963 to Sumiko, who died in 1993. They had a son, Kei (b. 1964), who is still living as of 2022.

Ichiyanagi died on 7 October 2022, at the age of 89.

Works 
As listed in Schott Music catalogue:

Operas 
1968 From the Works of Tadanori Yokoo (electronic music)
1989 Hiraizumi Enjo
1995 The Last Will of Fire
1995/98 Momo
2002 Hikari
2004 Ikuta-gawa Monogatari
2005 White Nights

Orchestral works 
1962 Asma for piano and orchestra
1964 The Field for koto and orchestra
1965 Life Music for modulators, tape and orchestra
1968 Up To Date Applause for orchestra, rock band and tape
1973 Chi for noh flute and orchestra
1980 In the Reflection of Lighting Image for percussion and orchestra
1981 Piano Concerto No. 1 "Reminiscences of Space"
1982/86 Engen for koto and orchestra
1983 Violin Concerto "Circulating Scenery"
1983–86 Paganini Personal for marimba and orchestra
1984 Time Surrounding for percussion and orchestra
1986 Symphony for Chamber Orchestra "Time Current"
1987 Interspace for string orchestra
1987 Piano Concerto No. 2 "Winter Portrait"
1988 Symphony "Berlin Renshi" for soprano, tenor, orchestra
1989 Voices from the Environment
1989 Symphonic Movement "Kyoto"
1989 Concerto for Koto and Chamber Orchestra "The Origin"
1989 Existence for organ and orchestra
1991 Piano Concerto No. 3 "Cross Water Roads"
1991 Luminous Space for sho, ondes martenot and orchestra
1992 Interplay for flute and string orchestra
1993 Symphony for Chamber Orchestra No. 2 "Undercurrent"
1993 Cosmos Ceremony for ryuteki, sho and orchestra
1994 Symphony No. 4 "Recollection of Reminiscence Beyond"
1994 "Coexistence" for shakuhachi and string orchestra
1995 Symphony No. 3 "Inner Communications"
1996 Coexistence for ondes martenot and orchestra
1997 Symphony No. 5 "Time Perspective" – on the theme of opera Momo1997 Symphony No. 2 "Undercurrent"
1997 Coexistence for orchestra
2001 Bridging2001 Symphony No. 6 "A Hundred Years From Now"
2001 Between Space and Time for chamber orchestra
2002 Returning to Sounds Environment for shakuhachi and orchestra
2003 To the Memory of Nugshead for wind orchestra
2004 Concertato for harp and chamber orchestra
2007 Symphony No. 7 "Ishikawa Paraphrase"
2009 Piano Concerto No. 4 "Jazz"
2011 Piano Concerto No. 5 "Finland"
2011/12 Symphony No. 8 "Revelation 2011"
2012 Concerto for marimba and orchestra
2014 Symphony No. 9 "Diaspora"
2016 Piano Concerto No. 6 "Zen"
2016 Symphony No. 10 "Scenes of Various Memories"
2017 Double Concerto for violin, cello and orchestra

 Chamber works 
1954 Sonata for violin and piano
1956 Trio for 2 flutes and harp
1957 String Quartet
1960 Stanzas for string instrument(s)
1961 For Strings1961 Duet for piano and string instrument(s)
1962 Sapporo for any number of players up to fifteen
1962 Activities for brass instruments
1964 String Quartet No. 1
1966 Modulator for Japanese instruments, string instruments, piano and modulator
1967 Appearance for 3 players and 2 operators
1978 Distance for noh flute, noh performer and ensemble
1978 Scenes I  for violin and piano
1979 Scenes II for violin and piano
1979 Recurrence for flute, clarinet, percussion, harp, piano, violin and cello
1981 Wa for 13-string koto, 17-string koto, piano and percussion
1981 Time in Tree, Time in Water for percussion and piano
1981 Scenes IV for violin and piano
1981 Before Darkness Appears for accordion and piano
1982 Scenes V for violin and piano
1982 Paganini Personal for marimba and piano
1982 Flowers Blooming in summer for harp and piano
1984 Wind trace for three keyboard percussion (marimba, vibraphone and antique cymbal)
1985 Piano Quintet "Prāna"
1985 Yami o Irodoru Mono for 2 violins and piano (revised 2006 for 2 violins, cello and piano)
1985 Yochô for ryuteki and piano
1986 Présage for 6 ondes martinots
1986 String Quartet No. 2 "Interspace"
1986 Interspace for sho and harp
1988 Transfiguration of the Moon for sho and violin
1988 Ten, Zui, Ho, Gyaku for shakuhachi and ondes martenot
1989 Wind Gradation for ryuteki and piano
1990 Troposphere for ondes martenot and marimba
1991 Interrelation I for cello and piano
1990 Trio Interlink for violin, piano and percussion
1992 Aquascape for marimba, flute, piano and 2 percussions
1992 Cosmos of Coexistence for marimba and piano
1992 Reflection for 9 players
1992 Brightening Wind for sho and piano
1992 Tenryuji for ryuteki, sho, shakuhachi, koto, ondes martenot and percussion
1993 Intercross for violin and piano
1993 Toki Sayuru for koto and piano
1994 String Quartet No. 3 "Inner-landscape"
1994 Trio Fantasy for piano, violin and cello
1995 Cosmic Harmony for cello and piano
1995 Music for Violin, Shô and Piano1997 Existence −In Memory of Kuniharu Akiyama− for clarinet and piano
1998 Interrelation II for violin and piano
1998 Mirage for English horn and double bass
1998 Mirage for accordion and harpsichord
1998 Mirage for sho and harpsichord
1998 Mirage for shakuhachi and piano
1999 String Quartet No. 4 "In the Forest"
1999 Metamorphosis for bassoon quartet
2001 Piano Quintet "Bridging"
2001 Spiritual Sight II for gagaku, reigaku, shomyo and cello
2002 Encounter for cello, ancient instruments, gagaku and shomyo
2005 Space Line for viol consort
2006 Variation "White Nights" for percussion ensemble
2006 Space Scene for flute, clarinet, violin, cello, accordion and piano
2007 Resonant Space for clarinet and piano
2008 Circular Space for flute, clarinet, cello, piano and percussion
2008 Hen'yo suru No-Kukan for Noh performers and 2 pianos
2008 Trio Webster for flute, clarinet and piano
2011 Paganini Personal for violin and piano
2011 Duo Interchange for violin and cello

 Works for keyboard 
1959–61 Music for Piano No. 1 – No. 71972 Piano Media for piano
1975 Bi no Bi for piano
1976 Multiple Spaces for organ
1976 Time Sequence for piano
1980 Two Existence for 2 pianos
1985–99 Cloud Atlas I–X for piano
1987 Inter Konzert for piano
1989 Piano Nature for piano
1990 Inexhaustible Fountain for piano
1990 Dimensions for organ
1992 Fantasy for organ
1992 Farewell to... – To the Memory of Luigi Nono for piano
1992 In Memory of John Cage for piano
1995 Imaginary Scenes for piano
2001 Piano Space for piano
2003 Piano Poem for piano
2009 Sen no Image no tame ni for 2 pianos
2010 Piano Craft for piano
2010 Sonatina for piano
2011 Paganini Personal for 2 pianos
2012 Waltz Solemnity for piano

 Works for other instruments 
1972 Vein of Sounds for harp
1972 Arrangements for percussion
1980 Scenes III for solo violin
1980 Wind Nuance for flute
1983 Portrait of Forest for solo marimba
1984 Cloud Figures for solo oboe
1984 Wind Trace for 3 keyboard percussion players
1986 Perspectives for solo violin
1987 Still Time III for harp
1989 Wind Stream for flute
1989 The Source for marimba
1990 Friends for violin
1991 Aki o Utu Oto for marimba
1991 Intoxicant Moon for ondes martenot
1993 Rhythm Gradation for timpani
1993 Omniscape for violin
1995 Generation of Space for double bass
1996 Still Time IV for flute
1996 Perspectives II for percussion
2000 In a Living Memory for flute solo
2001 Innervoice on the theme of Gagaku for marimba
2002 Ballade for marimba
2007 Green Rhythms for marimba

 Vocal works 
1967 Voice Act for mixed chorus and bassoon
1973 Voice Field for children's chorus and percussion
1977 Syntax for mixed chorus
1981 Aru Toki for soprano and piano
1983 Kinderkreuzzug for mixed chorus
1983 Kodomo no Jujigun for mixed chorus
1984 Heso no Uta for children's chorus
1985 Nadare no Toki for mixed chorus, marimba and piano
1985 Requiem for male chorus
1986 Mangetsu no Yoru no Kaiwa for mixed chorus and percussion
1989 Music for Art Kites for soprano and flute
1989 Genshiryoku Sensuikan "Onagazame" no Seitekina Kokai to Jisatsu no Uta for mixed chorus
1991 Song of Morning for female chorus and sho
1992 Desire for mixed chorus
1992 Hikari no Toride, Kaze no Shiro for mixed chorus
1993 White Horse for mixed chorus and tubular bells
1994 Scenes of Poems I  for mixed chorus and cello
1994 My Song for mezzo-soprano and marimba
1995 Sora ni Kotori ga Inakunatta Hi for clarinet and mixed chorus
1995 Toge for soprano and harpsichord
1996/98 Voice Perspectives for voice and sho
1997 Oral Poetry of the Native American for mixed chorus and flute
1998 Scenes of Poems I  for mixed chorus
1998 Three Songs for children's chorus (or female chorus) and marimba
2001 Furusato no Hoshi for mixed chorus and viola
2001 Futatsu no Uta for soprano and piano
2001 Michizane in Sanuki for mixed chorus and piano
2005/07 Attendance Flowers Funeral for soprano and piano
2005/07 Legend of the Water Flame for mixed chorus and piano
2007 "White Nights" Suite for mixed chorus and piano
2008 Coexistence for male chorus and traditional Japanese instrumental ensemble
2008 Three Songs for mixed chorus
2008 Mirai e for mixed chorus and piano

 Japanese instrumental works 
1980/86 Ôgenraku for gagaku ensemble, versions with and without shokyo
1982 Enenraku for gagaku ensemble
1983 Rinkaiiki for solo sangen
1983 Galaxy for solo sho
1983 Hikari-nagi for ryuteki and percussion
1984 Density for shakuhachi, 2 koto and sangen
1984 Clouds Shore, Wind Roots for reigaku and gagaku ensemble
1986 Still Time I for solo sho
1986 Still Time II for solo kugo (ancient harp)
1987 Reigaku Symphony "The Shadows Appearing through Darkness"
1987 Katachi naki Mugen no Yoha for solo koto
1988 Voices of Water for hitsu 
1988 Sensing the Color in the Wind for shakuhachi and 2 kotos
1988 Prāna for ryuteki, hichiriki, sho, kugo, hensho and dancer
1988 Transfiguration of the Flower for koto, sangen and shakuhachi
1989 Water Relativity for hitsu and kin
1989 Reigaku Symphony No. 2 "Jitsugetsu Byobu Isso - Kokai"
1990 The Way for 2 ryuteki, 2 hichiriki, 2 sho, shakuhachi, biwa, 2 koto, 2 percussion and female dancer
1990 Linked Poems of Autumn for solo koto
1990 The Way II for 4 ryuteki, 4 hichiriki, 5 sho, shakuhachi, biwa, 2 koto, 3 percussion and 10 shomyo
1991 Projection for solo koto
1992 Compound Tune, "Resonance, Luster and Color" for shakuhachi and 2 koto
1994 Unchu Kuyo Bosatsu for gagaku, reigaku and shomyo
1997 Land Mystery for shakuhachi and 20-string koto
1998 Still Time V for solo hōkyō (similar to Chinese fangxiang)
1998 Reigaku Kokyo for reigaku ensemble
2001 Ceremonial Space for ryuteki, hichiriki, sho, shakuhachi, 2 koto and percussion
2001 Hakko for sho and koto
2008 Coexistence 2008 for ancient instruments
2009 Ka-Cho-Fu-Getsu for Japanese instruments

 Electronic music 
1960 Music for Electric Metronomes1962 Parallel Music1966 Life Music1966 Situation for biwa, koto, violin, double bass, piano and multiplier
1966 Tinguely Mixture No.1, No. 21967 Extended Voices for voices and synthesizer
1969 Expansions for rock band and modulators
1969 Tokyo 1969 for various modulators, street sounds and rock band
1969 Theater Music1969 Mandalama1970 Environmental Music 1, 2 and 31970 Music for Living Space1975 The World1978 Perspectives for noh dancer, flute, violin, viola, cello, percussion and electronic music
2009 Transfiguration for harp and electronics

 Theater pieces 
1961 Event and Musique Concrète happening
1963–73 Pratyāhārā Event1966 Chair Event happening

 Film scores
1968 Farewell to the Summer Light, directed by Yoshishige Yoshida
1969 Eros + Massacre, directed by Yoshishige Yoshida
1970 Heroic Purgatory, directed by Yoshishige Yoshida
1971 Confessions Among Actresses, directed by Yoshishige Yoshida
1971 Metastasis, directed by Toshio Matsumoto
1973 Martial Law directed by Yoshishige Yoshida
1975 Everything Visible Is Empty, directed by Toshio Matsumoto
1975 Ātman, directed by Toshio Matsumoto
1980 Jun, directed by Hiroto Yokoyama
1986 Saya: Perspective in Love'', directed by Seiji Izumi

References

 Tokyo Concerts biographical page on Ichiyanagi (in Japanese), accessed 4 February 2010 
  (accessed 10 January 2014)

External links
 
 
 Julian Cope's Japrocksampler entry on Toshi Ichiyanagi

1933 births
2022 deaths
20th-century classical composers
20th-century Japanese male musicians
21st-century classical composers
21st-century Japanese musicians
21st-century Japanese male musicians
Japanese classical composers
Japanese male classical composers
Japanese opera composers
Male opera composers
Persons of Cultural Merit
Recipients of the Medal with Purple Ribbon
Recipients of the Order of Culture